Ksar el Barka are ruins in Mauritania. It was established in 1690 by the Kounta, who were from Ouadane.

See also
 Ksar

References 

Archaeological sites in Mauritania
Populated places established in 1690
Communes of Mauritania
Former populated places in Mauritania
1690 establishments in Africa